Mío: Paulina Y Sus Éxitos is the eighth compilation album by Mexican pop singer Paulina Rubio. It was released in 2006 and contains 20 tracks from Rubio's first 4 studio albums.

Track listing

References

Paulina Rubio compilation albums
2006 greatest hits albums
Spanish-language compilation albums